Washpool is a rural locality in the Scenic Rim Region, Queensland, Australia. In the  Washpool had a population of 95 people.

Geography 

Road infrastructure
Ipswich – Boonah Road (State Route 93) runs along the western boundary.

History 
In the  Washpool had a population of 95 people.

References 

Scenic Rim Region
Localities in Queensland